Copenhagen Studies in Indo-European is an academic book series on Indo-European studies and related subjects. The series was founded in 1999 and is published by Museum Tusculanum Press. Its chief editor was Jens Elmegård Rasmussen from its initiation until his death in 2013. The current chief editor is Birgit Anette Olsen.

Volumes

 #9. Kin, Clan and Community in Prehistoric Europe, edited by Birgit Anette Olsen and Benedicte Whitehead Nielsen (2021). 
 #8. Usque ad Radices. Indo-European Studies in Honour of Birgit Anette Olsen, edited by Bjarne Simmelkjær Sandgaard Hansen, Adam Hyllested, Anders Richardt Jørgensen, Guus Kroonen, Jenny Helena Larsson, Benedicte Nielsen Whitehead, Thomas Olander and Tobias Mosbæk Søborg (2017). 
 #7. Language and Prehistory of the Indo-European Peoples. A Cross-Disciplinary Perspective, edited by Adam Hyllested, Benedicte Nielsen Whitehead, Thomas Olander and Birgit Anette Olsen (2017). 
 #6. The Linguistic Roots of Europe, edited by Robert Mailhammer, Theo Vennemann and Birgit Anette Olsen (2015). 
 #5. Indo-European accent and ablaut, edited by Thomas Olander, Paul Widmer and Götz Keydana (2013).  
 #4. The Sound of Indo-European, edited by Benedicte Nielsen Whitehead, Thomas Olander, Birgit Anette Olsen and Jens Elmegård Rasmussen (2012).  
 #3. Internal Reconstruction in Indo-European, edited by Thomas Olander and Jens Elmegård Rasmussen (2009). 
 #2. Indo-European Word Formation, edited by Birgit Anette Olsen and James Clackson (2004). 
 #1. Selected Papers on Indo-European Linguistics, by Jens Elmegård Rasmussen (1999). Vol. 1-2.

External links
 Copenhagen Studies in Indo-European on the publisher's website.

Indo-European studies